Rapa is a Spanish crime thriller television series created by Pepe Coira and Fran Araújo and produced by Movistar Plus+ in collaboration with Portocabo. It stars Javier Cámara and Mónica López. It premiered on 19 May 2022.

Premise 
Amparo Seoane, Mayor of Cedeira, is murdered. Solving the crime becomes an obsession for Civil Guard sergeant Maite and local high school teacher Tomás, who was the only witness to the murder.

Cast

Accolades 

|-
| rowspan = "3" align = "center" | 2022 || rowspan = "3" | 28th Forqué Awards || colspan = "2" | Best TV Series ||  || rowspan = "3" | 
|-
| Best TV Actor || Javier Cámara || 
|-
| Best TV Actress || Mónica López ||  
|-
| rowspan = "5" align = "center" | 2023 || rowspan = "4" | 10th Feroz Awards || colspan = "2" | Best Drama Series ||  || rowspan = "4" | 
|-
| Best Actor in a TV Series || Javier Cámara || 
|-
| Best Actress in a TV Series || Mónica López || 
|-
| Best Supporting Actress in a TV Series || Lucía Veiga || 
|-
| 31st Actors and Actresses Union Awards || Best Television Actor in a Leading Role || Javier Cámara ||  || 
|}

References

External links 
 

Movistar+ network series
Spanish thriller television series
Television shows filmed in Spain
Spanish-language television shows
2020s Spanish drama television series
2022 Spanish television series debuts
Television shows set in Galicia (Spain)